"Go hard or go home" is an idiom meaning "if one does not put forth effort, then one might as well stop trying." It may also refer to:

 "Go Hard or Go Home" (album), a 2004 album by Fiend
 "Go Hard or Go Home" (song), a 2015 song by Wiz Khalifa and Iggy Azalea for the Furious 7 soundtrack
 "Go Hard or Go Home", a song by Kylie Minogue from Aphrodite
 "Go Hard or Go Home", a song by E-40 from My Ghetto Report Card